Little Salmon Lake is located southeast of Atwell, New York. Fish species present in the lake are sunfish, and brook trout. There is a four wheel drive trail off Haskell Road.

References

Lakes of Herkimer County, New York